Rana Ayyub is an Indian journalist and opinion columnist with The Washington Post. She is author of the investigative book Gujarat Files: Anatomy of a Cover Up.

Background and family
Rana Ayyub was born in Mumbai, India. Her father Mohammad Ayyub Waqif, was a writer with Blitz, a Mumbai-based magazine, and an important member of the progressive writers movement.  The city witnessed riots in 1992–93, during which time the family moved to the Muslim-majority suburb of Deonar, which is where Rana largely grew up. Ayyub is a practising Muslim.

Career
Rana's worked for Tehelka (lit. "commotion/uproar"), a Delhi-based investigative and political news magazine. Rana has previously been critical of the BJP in general and Narendra Modi. By her own account, a report done by Rana Ayyub was instrumental in sending Amit Shah, a close associate of Narendra Modi, to jail for several months in 2010.

At Tehelka, Rana worked as an investigative journalist and her big assignment was to carry out the sting operation upon which her book Gujarat Files was based. At the end of the sting operation, the management of Tehelka refused to publish any story written by Rana or based on the data collected by her. Rana continued to work with Tehelka for several months more. In November 2013, her boss Tarun Tejpal, the editor-in-chief and major shareholder of Tehelka, was accused of sexual harassment by one of his journalist subordinates. Rana Ayyub resigned from Tehelka in protest against the organisation's handling of the charge against Tejpal. She now works independently. In September 2019, Washington Post hired her as its contributing writer to the Global Opinions section.

In October 2020, HarperCollins India published an open letter written by Ayyub, to protest the controversial appointment of Actor Gajendra Chauhan as the Chairman of Film and Television Institute of India (FTII), as part of the book Inquilab: A Decade of Protest which contains speeches, lectures and letters said to "capture the most important events and issues of the past ten years."

Notable events

The Gujarat sting operation 
As an investigative journalist working with Tehelka, Rana Ayyub took up a project to conduct a prolonged sting operation aimed at snaring politicians and government officials of Gujarat and get them to reveal any potential cover-ups regarding the Gujarat riots of 2002. Rana Posing as Maithili Tyagi, a filmmaker from the American Film Institute, and set about befriending her intended targets. She spent around ten months in disguise, and got paid a regular monthly salary from Tehelka during this period. However, at the end of the exercise, the management of Tehelka felt that the recordings which she had made over the months did not provide any new or sensational information, that the data gathered by her was of inadequate quality, and that they could not publish any story on the basis of the new data.

The book 

In her book Gujarat Files: Anatomy of a Cover Up, Ayyub documented the verbatim transcripts of recordings, made using a concealed recording device, of many bureaucrats and police officers of Gujarat. The recordings were made in the course of an undercover investigation to reveal the views of bureaucrats and police officers on the post-2002 Gujarat riots and Police encounter killings. Ayyub had been posing as 'Maithili Tyagi', a student of the American Film Institute, having an ideological affinity for the Rashtriya Swayamsevak Sangh's beliefs, to enable her to make the recordings. But this book is called fictional by supreme Court of India. In Haren Pandya case bench said, ''The Book by Rana Ayyub is of no utility. It is based upon surmises, conjectures, and suppositions and has no evidentiary value” . It also said, "The opinion of a person is not in the realm of the evidence. There is a likelihood of the same being politically motivated, cannot be ruled out. The way in which the things have moved in Gujarat post-Godhra incident, such allegations and counter-allegations are not uncommon and had been raised a number of times and have been found to be untenable and afterthought".

Dispute with Tehelka 
Tarun Tejpal and Shoma Chaudhury have disputed Ayyub's claim that her story on fake encounters in Gujarat, which was the result of an eight-month long undercover investigation, was dropped by them. According to Tejpal, Ayyub's story was "incomplete". According to Chaudhury, Ayyub's story "did not meet the necessary editorial standards." Ayyub has responded to Tejpal and Chaudhury's assertions by noting that:

Reception 
Historian Ramachandra Guha had called Ayyub's Gujarat Files "a brave book." Jyoti Malhotra has noted that many journalists have privately applauded Ayyub's courage in authoring Gujarat Files. Priya Ramani has commented: "The abuses from the paid foot soldiers on Twitter bounce off her spiral curls smoothly." Reflecting on the procedure used by Ayyub in composing Gujarat Files, Nilanjan Mukhopadhyay has observed: "Going undercover and interviewing many who had been in the thick of gruesome extra-constitutional operations required bravado and this must be appreciated."

Ayyub's investigation of the alleged Gujarat fake encounters has been listed by Outlook magazine as one of the twenty greatest magazine stories of all time across the world.
In 2018, Ayyub was awarded the "most Resilient Global journalist" by Dutch non-profit Free Press Unlimited for resisting attempts to stifle her work.

Haren Pandya murder case 
In the Haren Pandya murder case, the Supreme Court of India dismissed Rana Ayyub's book, stating that "it is based upon surmises, conjectures, and suppositions and has no evidentiary value.". Ayyub termed the court's comments "puzzling", stating that the CBI had used her work as evidence in other related cases, and noting that no officer or bureaucrat had denied her claims or taken her to court.

Controversies 
In February 2022, Ayyub received scrutiny after the Enforcement Directorate (ED) locked assets worth over ₹1.77 crore of hers. This was done in relation to a money laundering case filed against her, for allegedly embezzling funds she acquired from the public in the name of charity. ED stated that Ayyub had transferred those funds to other accounts for personal spendings.

FIR was filed against Rana Ayyub in Dharwad due to her alleged comments against anti-hijab protestors  as Hindu terrorists.

Awards and recognition
 In October 2011, Rana Ayyub received the Sanskriti award for excellence in journalism.
 The 'Citation of Excellence' was conferred to Rana Ayyub in the 2017 edition of the Global Shining Light Award for her undercover investigation revealing state's top officials’ complicity during the 2002 Gujarat Riots.
 Actress Richa Chadda claimed to have been inspired by Rana Ayyub, who is also her friend, in 2016 film Chalk n Duster, where she plays a journalist.
 In 2018, Ayyub was awarded the Most Resilient Journalist Award by Free Press Unlimited for continuing her work "despite being harassed both online and offline and receiving death threats."
 In February 2020, Ayyub was awarded with McGill Medal for journalistic courage at University of Georgia's Grady College.
 She is the 2020 Voices of Courage and Conscience Awardee from the Muslim Public Affairs Council of America.
 She has also been named by Time magazine among ten global journalists who face maximum threats to their lives. She has been profiled by The New Yorker.
 On 28 June 2022, Ayyub was awarded the International John Aubuchon Award by the National Press Club.

Threats on social media
In 2018, Rana was at the receiving end of multiple death and rape threats on twitter. Her personal details were made public and a deepfake pornographic video was released. In April 2018 she filed a complaint with Delhi Police, who subsequently decided to close the case in August 2020 saying that "despite efforts the culprits could not be identified yet." The United Nations Human Rights office called on the authorities in India to "act urgently to protect" her from death threats following an online hate campaign. The US State department's 2020 Human Rights Report specifically mentions the online trolling and death threats faced by Ayyub. In its report documenting online attacks against journalists around the world, the international non-profit Reporters Without Borders discussed the hate speech unleashed against Ayyub and called on the government and Delhi police to protect her.

In 2022, members of the Neo Nazi inspired alt right groups had created Bulli Bai, an app for fake online auction of Muslim women in India with intention to denigrate and harass the minorities. Ayyub and several prominent women journalists in India were targeted. They were also targeted with thousands of hate messages by the secret app  Tek Fog allegedly used by the BJP supporters. The app was used to spread right wing propaganda online.

References

External links

 
 Rana Ayyub at Washington Post

Living people
Indian editors
Indian columnists
Indian women editors
Indian women columnists
Indian investigative journalists
Indian women journalists
21st-century Indian journalists
21st-century Indian women writers
21st-century Indian writers
1984 births
People involved in the Citizenship Amendment Act protests
People from Mumbai
Women writers from Maharashtra
Journalists from Maharashtra
21st-century Indian Muslims